Anika the Warrior (from , "unbeatable, unbeaten") is a Bogatyr, a knight errant character of Russian fairy tales. According to a "universally known religious ballad", he was a violent and sacrilegious man who set out to destroy the Holy Sepulchre in Jerusalem, but was stopped by the half-beast Wonder. Anika challenges Wonder to a duel, but is immediately overcome because Wonder is Death in disguise. Though he begs for more time and attempts to bribe Death, no mercy is given. Proverbially, an "Anika the Warrior" is one engaged in something as hopeless as a fight against death. He appears in the folk plays Tsar Maximilian and King Herod, and is mentioned in Maxim Gorky's Childhood. Its plot is loosely based on the Byzantine epic about Digenes Akritas.

References 

 
 Богатыри и витязи Русской земли: По былинам, сказаниям и песням. (1990) Moscow: "Moskovsky Rabochy" publishers 

Russian folklore
Male characters in literature
Russian knights
Fictional knights
Church of the Holy Sepulchre